Palmer DePaulis (born 1945) is an American politician in the state of Utah. He was the former mayor of Salt Lake City and is a member of the Democratic Party.

Career
DePaulis, born in 1945, served as the 31st mayor of Salt Lake City from 1985 to 1991. He was the first Roman Catholic mayor of Salt Lake City. He subsequently served as Chief of Staff to Utah Attorney General Jan Graham, as a Commissioner at the Utah State Tax Commission and as Executive Director of the Department of Community and Culture. In June 2010, Governor Gary Herbert appointed him as Executive Director of the Department of Human Services.

See also 

 List of mayors of Salt Lake City

References

Living people
American Roman Catholics
Mayors of Salt Lake City
Utah Democrats
1945 births